Battle of Aden may refer to:
 Siege of Aden (1513), Portuguese assault on Aden
 1548 capture of Aden, Ottoman capture of Aden
 Battle of Aden (1586) Portuguese campaign on Aden
 Aden Expedition (1839), British capture of Aden
 Aden Emergency (1963–1967), uprising against the British rule
 Battle of Aden Airport (2015), fought between the Hadi-led government, Houthi rebels and Saleh loyalists
 Battle of Aden (2015), fought between the Hadi-led government, Houthi rebels and Saleh loyalists
 Battle of Aden (2018), fought between the Hadi-led government and Southern Transitional Council (STC)

See also 
 Battle of Sanaa (disambiguation)